Wuji Baifeng Wan  is a blackish-brown pill used in Traditional Chinese medicine to "replenish qi and blood, regulate menstruation and arrest excessive leukorrhea". It is slightly aromatic and tastes sweet and slightly bitter. It is used where there is "deficiency of both qi and blood marked by emaciation and general feebleness, aching and limpness of loins and knees, disorders of menstruation with abnormal uterine bleeding and excessive leukorrhea". The binding agent of the pill is honey. Wuji Baifeng Wan translates to: Black Chicken White Phoenix Pill.

Chinese classic herbal formula

See also
 Chinese classic herbal formula
 Bu Zhong Yi Qi Wan

References

 Traditional Chinese medicine pills